Moore Embayment — shown on some maps as Moore Bay — is a large ice-filled embayment between Shults Peninsula and Minna Bluff, along the northwest side of the Ross Ice Shelf, Antarctica. It was discovered and named by Captain Robert F. Scott's Discovery Expedition, 1901–04. Admiral Sir Arthur Moore, Naval Commander-in-Chief at Cape Town, placed the resources of the naval dockyard at Cape Town at the disposal of the Discovery for much-needed repairs before the ship proceeded to New Zealand and the Antarctic.

References

External links

Bays of the Ross Dependency
Hillary Coast